I Love You (German: Ich liebe dich) is a 1938 German romantic comedy film directed by Herbert Selpin and starring Viktor de Kowa, Luise Ullrich and Olga Limburg. It was shot at the Johannisthal Studios in Berlin. The film's sets were designed by the art directors Karl Weber and Erich Zander. It is in the style of a screwball comedy, inspired by the story of Adam and Eve.

Cast
 Viktor de Kowa as Amerikaner Percy
 Luise Ullrich as 	Fotografin Eva
 Olga Limburg as 	Evas Tante
 Joachim Rake as 	Percys Freund Max
 Herbert Weissbach as Percys Freund Günther
 Arthur Reinhardt as Vagabund spielender Freund
 Helmut Heyne as Vagabund spielender Freund
 Lothar Devaal as 	Vagabund spielender Freund
 Max Harry Ernst as Tänzer beim Kostümball

References

Bibliography
 Klaus, Ulrich J. Deutsche Tonfilme: Jahrgang 1938. Klaus-Archiv, 1988.
 Niven, Bill, Hitler and Film: The Führer's Hidden Passion. Yale University Press, 2018.
 Rentschler, Eric. The Ministry of Illusion: Nazi Cinema and Its Afterlife. Harvard University Press, 1996.

External links 
 

1938 films
Films of Nazi Germany
German comedy films
1938 comedy films
1930s German-language films
German black-and-white films
1930s German films
Films directed by Herbert Selpin
Tobis Film films
Films shot at Johannisthal Studios

de:Ich liebe Dich (1938)